Haluk Dinçer (born 1962) is a Turkish business executive. He has been Executive Board Member of Sabanci Holding Turkey's leading industrial and financial group, since February 2002, and Financial Services Group President since April 2020.

Biography
Haluk Dinçer was born in Istanbul, Turkey in 1962. After graduating from Saint-Joseph Private French High School (Istanbul), he received a B.S.E. degree in Mechanical Engineering in 1985 and an M.B.A. in 1988, both from the University of Michigan Ann Arbor.

Career
Haluk Dinçer began his career in August in 1985 as a project engineer at General Motors Global Technical Center - Detroit, taking part in various development projects within the car body engineering team.

Dinçer joined Sabanci Group in August 1995, serving initially as Executive Board Member, and then in December 1995, as Executive Vice Chairman of the Group's automotive subsidiary Temsa. While acting as Bus Group Director between May 1998 and October 2001, he played a critical role in expanding the bus product range, improving production quality to world standards and developing global sales.

In October 2001, he assumed responsibilities within the Holding company, first as Food Group Vice President, and six months later, as Holding Executive Board Member and Food Group President, in charge of joint ventures with Danone and Kraft.  He also initiated Gıdasa in December 2002, and built up a large packaged food and beverage portfolio with domestically well-known brands.   

After his appointment as Food and Retail Group President in September 2004, Dinçer took on a leadership role in two additional joint ventures, with Carrefour and Dia, world's leading mass-merchant chains, as well as electronics retailer TeknoSA.  He successfully led massive store organic and inorganic expansion of all three chains, leveraging Sabanci brand, transformation of traditional retail and fast development of shopping malls in Turkey.

After the Group's divestment of its food business in August 2007 and organizational restructuring in March 2011, Haluk Dinçer took over as Retail and Insurance Group President. Along with his previous responsibilities, the appointment put Dinçer in charge of the non-life insurer Aksigorta, and the pensions and life insurance provider Avivasa, two joint ventures with leading global insurance companies, Ageas and Aviva respectively.

In July 2013, Dinçer initiated Kliksa, an e-commerce startup to adapt electronics retailing to pure online format, and steered its fast development over the next five years.

Under Dinçer's leadership, Avivasa reached the largest fund size of the private pension sector in 2015, and has consistently maintained this position since. In the meantime, Aksigorta has proven to be the leader in innovation in the insurance sector with the first use of robotics in operations.

In May 2021, Ageas acquired Aviva's stake in Avivasa and the company was rebranded as Agesa. Dinçer maintained his position as chairman of the board.

Upon reorganization of the group in June 2016, Dinçer was named insurance group president and later in April 2020, financial services group president. With this role, he currently serves as chairman of the board of Aksigorta and Avivasa as well as the group's real estate portfolio company Exsa, hospitality companies Tursa and Ankara Enternasyonel Otelcilik, both partnering with Hilton Hotel & Resorts, and as board member of Brisa, Group's joint venture with Bridgestone, the world's largest tire and rubber company.

Non-business activities
Haluk Dinçer served as president of TÜSIAD –  Turkish Industry and Business Association, Turkey's premier business organization, from June 2014 until January 2015, and as vice-president, from January 2010 until June 2014.

Dinçer also served as president of Turkish-American Business Council (TAIK), a member of the Foreign Economic Relations Board of Turkey, from September 2008 until October 2014.

In June 2010 and November 2011, he represented Turkey at the G-20 Business Summit, in Toronto  and Cannes respectively.

From 2015 until 2018, he participated in the International Advisory Council of the Brookings Institution, the think-tank based in Washington D.C.

Since February 2018, Dinçer has been a board member of the Global Relations Forum (GRF), an independent, non-profit association based in Istanbul, dealing with international affairs and global issues.

In June 2019, he became a member of the Geneva Association, the leading international think-tank of the insurance industry.

Dinçer is currently a member of TÜSIAD's Council of Presidents, an advisory body to the association's board.

References

External links

1962 births
Living people
Businesspeople from Istanbul
Turkish mechanical engineers
Ross School of Business alumni
Turkish billionaires